Boa Nova is a municipality in the state of Bahia in the North-East region of Brazil.

The municipality contains part of the  Boa Nova National Park, established in 2010, a centre for birdwatching.
It also contains the  Boa Nova Wildlife Refuge, created at the same time and adjoining the national park.

See also
List of municipalities in Bahia

References

Municipalities in Bahia